Oksana (Dmytrenko) Platero is a Ukrainian ballroom and Latin dancer. She spent five seasons as a member of the troupe on Dancing with the Stars in the United States. She joined the United Kingdom's Strictly Come Dancing as a professional dancer in series 14.

Early life
Oksana Dmytrenko  was born on 29 October 1988 in Ukraine. Dmytrenko's father left the family when she was five years old, leaving her mother, Inna, to raise Oksana as a single parent. The family lived in the city of Kharkiv where Inna sold clothing. At age six, Inna enrolled Dmytrenko in dance lessons. Dmytrenko has one younger brother, who was born in Ukraine after Oksana moved to the United States.  In 2017, she joined  Mira Quien Baila as a professional dancer in season 5.

Career
Oksana began competing as a Latin and ballroom dancer with partner Artem Plakhotnyi and later Igor Kantsedal. In 2004 she began partnering with Aleksandr Altukhov. The pair first competed for Ukraine and then moved to the United States when she was 18 years old.

In 2011, Oksana became a member of the first "Troupe" on Dancing with the Stars season 12. She would remain part of the troupe for five seasons, through season 16. After leaving Dancing with the Stars she performed with Ballroom with a Twist. She also choreographed for So You Think You Can Dance.

Strictly Come Dancing 
In 2016, the BBC announced Platero would join Strictly Come Dancing as a professional dancer in series 14. She was paired with television personality Robert "Judge" Rinder. The pair were eliminated in the Quarterfinals and finished in 5th place. The BBC on June 21, 2017 announced that Platero was leaving Strictly Come Dancing after one series.

Series 14 performances

Personal life
Dmytrenko  married fellow dancer and So You Think You Can Dance alum Jonathan Platero in 2014. The wedding was featured on David Tutera: CELEBrations.

References 

1988 births
Ukrainian ballroom dancers
Women in Red 2016
Living people
Naturalized citizens of the United States
Ukrainian expatriates in England
American expatriates in England